Georg Adolf Wilhelm Årlin (30 December 1916 – 27 June 1992) was a Swedish film actor who appeared in 50 films between 1940 and 1988. Born in Rödeby, a southern Sweden locality in Blekinge County's Karlskrona Municipality, Georg Årlin died in Lövestad at the age of 75.

Partial filmography

 Vi Masthuggspojkar (1940) - Pelle Nyman
 The Ghost Reporter (1941) - Editor (uncredited)
 Lasse-Maja (1941) - Priest
 Snapphanar (1941) - Guerilla soldier (uncredited)
 Prästen som slog knockout (1943) - Merchant Bergquist (uncredited)
 Natt i hamn (1943) - Detective (uncredited)
 Kungajakt (1944) - Chaplain
 The Journey Away (1945) - Hotel guest (uncredited)
 I Love You Karlsson (1947) - Karlsson senior (uncredited)
 Barabbas (1953) - Lazarus
 Kärlek på turné (1955) - Hotel clerk
 Blue Sky (1955) - Lundberg
 Åsa-Nisse in Military Uniform (1958) - Doctor
 Laila (1958) - Parish constable
 The Judge (1960) - Manager Randel
 Gøngehøvdingen (1961) - Colonel Sparre
 Swedish Wedding Night (1964) - Johan Borg
 Lockfågeln (1971) - Svanhals
 Emil i Lönneberga (1971) - Prästen
 New Mischief by Emil (1972) - Prästen
 Cries and Whispers (1972) - Fredrik
 Inferno (1973, TV Movie) - Friend in Lund
 Emil och griseknoen (1973) - Prästen
 Skärseld (1975) - Brunetto Latini
 Release the Prisoners to Spring (1975) - Rådman
 The Brothers Lionheart (1977) - Tengil
 The Simple-Minded Murderer (1982) - Parish Constable (uncredited)
 Fanny and Alexander (1982) - Colonel - Teatern
 Vargens tid (1988) - Tilo
 Flickan vid stenbänken (1989, TV Series) - Kusken

References

External links

1916 births
1992 deaths
People from Karlskrona Municipality
Swedish male film actors
20th-century Swedish male actors